The 1981 SANFL Grand Final was an Australian rules football competition. Port Adelaide beat Glenelg by 95 to 44.

References 

SANFL Grand Finals
SANFL Grand Final, 1981